George W. Simpson (December 21, 1870 in Baltimore, Maryland – August 17, 1951 in Manhattan, New York City) was an American lawyer and politician from New York.

Life
The family removed to New York City shortly after George was born.

Simpson contested the election of Progressive Henry Salant to the New York State Senate (19th D.), and was seated on April 29, 1913, in the 136th New York State Legislature. He remained in the State Senate until 1916, sitting in the 137th, 138th and 139th New York State Legislatures.

He was a City Magistrate from 1918 to 1931 when he resigned from the bench.

He died on August 17, 1951, at his home at 425 West 57th Street in Manhattan.

Sources
 SURPLUS OF MAGISTRATES in NYT on March 31, 1918
 HYLAN REPLACES TIERNAN AS JUDGE IN ECKERT INQUIRY in NYT on August 28, 1920
 SIMPSON QUITS BENCH AS HE FACES INQUIRY in NYT on January 17, 1931 (subscription required)
 GEORGE W. SIMPSON, ONCE MAGISTRATE, 81 in NYT on August 18, 1951 (subscription required)

1870 births
1951 deaths
Democratic Party New York (state) state senators
People from Manhattan
New York (state) state court judges
Politicians from Baltimore
Lawyers from Baltimore